"One Too Many" is a song by New Zealand-born Australian singer Keith Urban and American pop singer Pink from Urban's eleventh studio album, The Speed of Now Part 1 (2020). The song was written by Peter Wallevik & Daniel Davidsen (collectively known as PhD), Cleo Tighe, James Norton (aka Boy Matthews), and Mich Hansen (aka Cutfather). "One Too Many" was debuted at the 55th Academy of Country Music Awards on 16 September 2020 and was released that day as the third single from The Speed of Now Part 1. The song has been serviced to both country and pop radio formats in various territories.

At the 2021 ARIA Music Awards, the song was nominated for Song of the Year.

At the 2022 Queensland Music Awards, the release won Highest Selling Single of the Year.

Background 
Urban said "I've always loved Pink's voice, but her artistry and her multi-faceted ability to create, and her God-given talent, truly makes her one of the greatest voices of our time." The song's concept is a couple trying to make their way back to one another after one partner regains consciousness following a night of drinking and the other half attempts to avoid yet another fight.

Music video 
The official music video for "One Too Many" was directed by Dano Cerny, and released on 18 September 2020, it begins with shots of various wreckage bobbing along the surface of the water, including a guitar, a telephone, sheet music and other items. Urban is out on the water, using a bobbing sofa as a life raft as he floats along. Then back on shore, Pink sits alone on the beach as she looks out to sea. The pair harmonize as they head into the chorus, each singing out towards each other even though they're not physically in the same spot.

Live performances 
"One Too Many" was performed at the 55th Academy of Country Music Awards by Keith Urban and Pink on 16 September 2020.

Personnel 
Credits adapted from AllMusic.
Nathan Barlowe – gang vocals, handclaps
Spencer Clarke – assistant engineer
Cutfather – producer
Daniel Davidsen – bass guitar, composer, acoustic guitar, electric guitar, keyboards, programming
Josh Ditty – recording
Jerry Flowers – gang vocals, handclaps
Serban Ghenea – mixing
John Hanes – engineer
Mich Hansen (aka Cutfather) – composer, percussion
Scott Johnson – production coordination
Boy Matthews – background vocals
Dan McCarroll – producer
Randy Merrill – mastering engineer
James Norton (aka Boy Matthews) – composer
PhD – producer
Pink – featured vocals
Marco Sonzini – recording
Cleo Tighe – background vocals, composer
Keith Urban – acoustic guitar, electric guitar, producer, lead vocals
Peter Wallevik – composer, keyboards, piano, programming
Nicolas Weilmann – assistant engineer

Charts

Weekly charts

Year-end charts

Certifications

|-

Release history

References 

2020 songs
2020 singles
Keith Urban songs
Male–female vocal duets
Pink (singer) songs
Song recordings produced by Cutfather
Songs about alcohol
Songs written by Cleo Tighe
Songs written by Cutfather
Songs written by Daniel Davidsen
Songs written by Keith Urban
Songs written by Peter Wallevik
Songs written by Pink (singer)
Capitol Records Nashville singles